Agonum anthracinum is a species of ground beetle from a subfamily of Platyninae. It was described by Dejean in 1831 and is found in Mexico and the United States.

References

Beetles described in 1831
anthracinum
Beetles of North America